Playford Highway (with Telegraph Road and Kohinoor Road through Kingscote at its eastern end, and Cape Borda Road at its western end) is a main road on Kangaroo Island in South Australia, with its eastern end designated part of route B23. It extends from Kingscote through Cygnet River and Parndana to Cape Borda.

Major junctions
Playford Highway is entirely contained within the Kangaroo Island Council local government area.

References

Highways in South Australia
Kangaroo Island